Charles James Ball (1851-1924) was classical and Hebrew master at Merchant Taylors School, chaplain of Lincoln's Inn, some time reader of Assyriology in the University of Oxford, and rector of St. Giles Church in Bletchington, a village  north of Oxford.

Writings
As a biblical commentator, he wrote "The Prophecies of Jeremiah with a Sketch of his Life and Times" (1890) for the Expositor's Bible series, and for the Speaker's Commentary, and contributed the volumes on 2 Kings and 1 and 2 Chronicles in Charles Ellicott's commentary series. Ball was also considered a "recognised authorit[y] in Assyriology", with published notes on the Nin-Mag' Inscription and Inscriptions of Nebuchadrezzar the Great.

Ball notes, and considers plausible, the possibility that the prophet Jeremiah wrote the Book of Job "as some suppose", and suggests that Psalm 71, "which seems to be from his pen, and which wants the usual heading 'A Psalm of David'", could also have been written by Jeremiah.

References

British Assyriologists
Church of England priests
People associated with the University of Oxford